Sri Krishna Pandaveeyam is a 1966 Indian Telugu-language Film based on Hindu Puranas directed by N. T. Rama Rao who wrote the film with Samudrala Sr. It is produced by N. Trivikrama Rao under the NAT and Ramakrishna Cine Studios. The film stars N. T. Rama Rao, Uday Kumar and S. Varalakshmi, with music composed by T. V. Raju. N. T. Rama Rao portrayed the roles of both Krishna and Duryodhana in this movie. it also marked the Telugu debut for actress, K. R. Vijaya. The film was successful at the box office.

Plot 
The film depicts the adolescent age of the Pandavas and Krishna and shows the events in the Mahabharata, focusing on the later chapters of Adi Parva and the first half of Sabha Parva.

ACT I
The opening shot of the movie shows Kunti praying for Lord Krishna's protection of the Pandavas. Lord Krishna consoles Kunti and promises to ever protect the Pandavas and guide them through troubles and problems that may occur in their life.

The story of Sakuni
The sons of Pandu and Dhrutarashtra's progeny break into an argument. When Duryodhana insults the Pandavas as "dependents", Bhima counters by saying that, the Kauravas are the progeny of a widow. Duryodhana asks Veda Vyasa for an explanation. He is then told that, since his mother, Gandhari had an astrological defect, she was first married off to a sheep and then married to his father. Duryodhana gains animosity towards the kingdom of Gandhara where the king, the father of his mother Gandhari, rules. He attacks Gandhara and lays waste to the whole kingdom. He also imprisons the Gandhara royal family in his prison. He gives them only one rice grain per prisoner and that too, the leftover food of the Kauravas clan. The prisoners start fighting for the few rice grains thrown at them. The king of Gandhara then stops everyone from grabbing the little food that is provided. He says that instead of everyone dying, they could keep at least one of their princes alive. He chooses Sakuni to be alive. Sakuni takes an oath that he will do everything he can to destroy the entire Kaurava clan. The whole royal family except Sakuni dies in the prison. Sakuni makes magic dice from his father's spinal cord. The magic dice show exactly the number that he would want. Duryodhana takes pity on the lone prisoner, Sakuni after the rest of the Gandhara royal family dies in prison out of starvation. Sakuni joins the evil coterie of Duryodhana, Karna, and Dussasana.

The wax house
Sakuni schemes an evil plan to kill the Pandavas through trickery. He constructs a house made of wax in Varanasi. The Pandavas are ordered to go on pilgrimage to Varanasi until the troubled affairs of the state are resolved. Krishna sees through the plan of the evil Sakuni. He warns Bheema to keep an eye on miscreants trying to burn the house. He later orders Bheema to dig a tunnel from the wax house into a forest nearby, which Bheema does. At midnight, as Krishna predicted, the house is burned on the orders of Duryodhana.

Hidimbi
Bheema, however, carries his four brothers and mother on his back and races through the tunnel, and takes them to the hiding spot. There, a certain cannibal rakshasa named Hidimbasura lives with his sister Hidimbi. He smells the scent of human beings and orders his sister to bring them. Hidimbi, however, falls in love at first sight with Bheema. Unable to wait any longer, Hidimbasura comes to kill the Pandavas himself. Bheema, however, kills him very easily. Hidimbi is married to Bheema. She later gives birth to Ghatotkacha from this union.

ACT II
Here the movie takes the focus off the Pandavas and instead focuses on Lord Krishna as the primary character for some duration.

The courtship of Rukmini

Sisupala, the king of Chedi and Rukmi are the kings under the emperor Jarasandha. All three have a deep hatred toward Krishna. Jarasandha proposes that Rukmi should marry his sister, Rukmini, to Sisupala, unaware that she is in love with Krishna. Narada acts as the mediator between the loving couple. After a brief courtship, Rukmini elopes with Krishna. Rukmi tries to stop Krishna and challenges him to a fight. Krishna easily defeats him and grants his wife - Rukmini's wish by keeping him alive. He, however, shaves half of his hair to add insult to the injury.

ACT III
The movie returns to its primary focus on the Pandavas with Duryodhana taking a major share of the screen space towards the end.

The slaying of Bakasura

Bakasura, Bhima, Kichaka, Jarasandha and Duryodhana are all born with their fate mingled with each other. As a result of that, the first amongst the five to kill another - will eventually kill the other three. This secret is known to Krishna alone.

The Pandavas live under the guise of sadhus in a remote town. Bakasura is a very powerful monster who plagues the town. He blackmails them to send two oxen, a cartload of food, and a human being every day to quench his hunger. It so happens that, the house owners of the Pandavas get their turn to send the human being on that day. However, Kunti says that she would rather sacrifice her son instead of their only one since she has five children.

Bheema sets off to the monster's place, but on the way, he eats all the food. After a very ferocious fight with the monster, he does kill it in the end. Bheema emerges as the victor.

Draupadi

The king of Panchala, Drupada announces an archery contest to win the hand of his daughter in marriage. Krishna tricks Karna into losing the contest. Arjuna, however, shows up as a Brahmin youth and wins the contest. Thus he wins Draupadi as a prize. He goes home and tells his mother that he has won a prize. Unknowingly, his mother asks him to share his prize with all the five brothers. Thus all five brothers, marry Draupadi.

Indraprastha

As the Pandavas have emerged from their disguise, they get a share of the Kaurava kingdom and develop the city of Indraprastha.

The slaying of Jarasandha

Jarasandha is the nemesis of Krishna. No one other than Bheema or the other three mentioned earlier can defeat him, and the legend is that Krishna escapes to Dwaraka due to threats from Jarasandha, and his repeated failures in defeating the latter. This time Bheema and Krishna go in disguised form, as Brahmins (purohits) into the fortress of Jarasandha. There they request a duel from Jarasandha. Jarasandha chooses Bheema as his sparring partner. During the fight, Krishna signals Bheema to tear Jarasandha vertically apart into two pieces so the latter will be killed for good. However the body parts of Jarasandha rejoin because of a boon he possesses, and he regains his life. After a few failed attempts, Krishna signals Bheema to throw apart Jarasandha's torn body parts in opposite directions. This time, however, Jarasandha dies.

Rajasuya Yaga

Dharmaraju (Yudhisthira) performs the Rajasuya Yaga, to be crowned as the emperor. The Kauravas, arrive at Indraprastha as guests. Duryodhana visits the Mayasabha, where he is overawed with the beauty of the sculpture and architecture. However, when he is returning, he trips and falls into a pool. He hears some people laughing and sees Draupadi is among the crowd. He then concludes that she is behind all this and vows to avenge the insult in the presence of his brothers, Karna and Sakuni.

The slaying of Sisupala

Sisupala is a relative of Sri Krishna and he is born with a lot of abnormal features. When Krishna touches him during his childhood, the child becomes normal. However a result of the broken curse, Krishna is destined to kill Sisupala. Krishna however, promises Sisupala's mother that he would give his son a hundred chances before killing him.

When Dharmaraju elects Krishna as the chief guest at the Rajasuya Yaga, Sisupala becomes enraged and foul-mouths Krishna. Krishna counts a hundred absurdities hurled at him by Sisupala. Then after his hundredth mistake, Krishna hurls his discus Sudarsana Chakra towards him. Sisupala's head is severed. When Duryodhana calls for Krishna to be arrested, Krishna unveils his Viswaroopam.

Cast

Music 

Music was composed by T. V. Raju. Music released on SAREGAMA Audio Company.

Reception
The film had run 100 days in 9 centers and garnered positive critical acclaim for its direction and acting prowess.

The title of the 2019 film Mathu Vadalara was inspired by a song of the same name from this film.

Accolades 
Nandi Award for Second Best Feature Film - Silver won by N. Trivikrama Rao.

Other
VCDs and DVDs on - Universal Videos, SHALIMAR Video Company, Hyderabad

References

External links

1966 films
1960s Telugu-language films
Hindu mythological films
Films scored by T. V. Raju
Films based on the Mahabharata
Films directed by N. T. Rama Rao